Mesocyclops insulensis is a species of copepod in the family Cyclopidae, endemic to Lake Bemapaza, on Nosy Bé island, Madagascar.

References

Cyclopidae
Freshwater crustaceans of Africa
Endemic fauna of Madagascar
Arthropods of Madagascar
Taxonomy articles created by Polbot
Crustaceans described in 1982